"The Nine Days Wonder" is the ninth episode of the fifth and final series of the period drama Upstairs, Downstairs. It first aired on 2 November 1975 on ITV.

Background
"The Nine Days Wonder" was recorded in the studio on 1 and 2 May 1975. The location footage was filmed on 22 April in Eaton Place in Belgravia, and in nearby Theed Street. The director of the episode, Simon Langton, was the son of David Langton, who played Richard Bellamy.

Cast
 Simon Williams as James Bellamy
 Gordon Jackson as Hudson
 Jean Marsh as Rose
 David Langton as Richard Bellamy
 Joan Benham as Lady Prudence Fairfax
 Lesley-Anne Down as Georgina Worsley
 Christopher Beeny as Edward
 Gareth Hunt as Frederick
 Jacqueline Tong as Daisy
 Jenny Tomasin as Ruby
 Martin Wimbush as Andrew Bouverie
 Tommy Wright as Picket Leader
 John Breslin as Len Finch
 Roy Pattison as Arnold Thompson

Plot
"The Nine Days Wonder" opens on 1 May 1926; two days later on 3 May, the General Strike is called. Virginia is in Scotland, and unable to return because of the strike, while Mrs Bridges is in Felixstowe on holiday. She telephones 165 Eaton Place, worried about food shortages, and unbeknownst to anyone else, soon orders some food to be delivered to 165. Hudson gets permission from Richard to volunteer as a Special Constable, as he had during the War. Within days on the start of the strike, Edward is attacked by a striker while in the car.

Georgina and her circle of friends see the event as a chance to have fun by volunteering to drive buses or trains. James takes it far more seriously, and himself volunteers to drive a bus, and Frederick accompanies him. On one journey they encounter a group of strikers, who are unwilling to let them pass. The conductor on the bus is university student Andrew Bouverie. When Bouverie is briefly at Eaton Place, he remembers having briefly met Georgina at a party, and drops hints about not having anywhere nice to stay. However, Lady Prudence then offers him a bed in her house, as she has decided to help out by becoming a "landlord", having already got two university students staying.

Ruby's uncle Len Finch comes down from Barnsley with a friend Arnold Thompson. Both are down for a delegates meeting. They take tea in the Servants' Hall, when Mr. Hudson is out, and Thompson gives Edward, who is sympathetic to the strikers, a copy of The British Worker newspaper. When Mr Hudson comes back and finds this, he orders it to be burned. On 12 May, minutes after the strike is called off, Len Finch and Arnold Thompson arrive to say goodbye to Ruby. When told of the strike's end, they are both deflated.

Footnotes

References
"The Nine Days Wonder" on Updown.org.uk—Upstairs, Downstairs Fansite

1975 British television episodes
Upstairs, Downstairs (series 5) episodes
Fiction set in 1926